{{Infobox person
| image       = Jack Colvin.jpg
| imagesize   = 
| caption     =
| birth_date  = 
| birth_place = Lyndon, Kansas, U.S.
| death_date  = 
| death_place = North Hollywood, Los Angeles, California, U.S.
| known_for   = The Incredible HulkChild's Play| occupation  = 
| yearsactive = 1966–2005
}}

Jack Colvin  (October 13, 1934 – December 1, 2005) was an American character actor of theatre, film and TV. He is best known for the role of the tabloid reporter Jack McGee in The Incredible Hulk television franchise (1977–82).

Early life

He began his stage career as a child performer. At age seventeen, Colvin became a private student of Michael Chekhov.

Career
Although he appeared in hundreds of films and television shows, he always returned to the theatre. His stage roles include Marchbanks in Shaw's Candida, Mercutio in Romeo and Juliet, Morgan Evans in The Corn Is Green, Algernon in The Importance of Being Earnest, Constantin in The Seagull, and Edmund in Long Day's Journey into Night.

His film credits include Scorpio (1973), The Stone Killer (1973), The Terminal Man (1974), Rooster Cogburn (1975) and Child's Play (1988) among others.

His partnership with Yvonne Wilder in one of the more successful comedy acts of the 1960s, Colvin and Wilder, led him to appear all over the U.S. on stage and on television, including The Dean Martin Show, The Ed Sullivan Show and The Tonight Show Starring Johnny Carson, culminating in their farewell appearance at Carnegie Hall in New York City.

Other television roles were on programs such as Quincy, M.E., Switch, The Rockford Files, The Six Million Dollar Man, Kojak, and The Bionic Woman. While under contract to Universal Pictures for seven years, he appeared in over 100 hours of television programming.

He taught at the central Experimental Film School of Rome, the University of Southern California, Cal State Northridge, the American Academy of Dramatic Arts, the 1994 Michael Chekhov International Workshop in Sussex, the Centre for Performance Research at the University of Birmingham in 1999, and The Michael Chekhov Association's New York University June Intensive in 2004. 

Colvin served as the artistic director of the Michael Chekhov Studio USA West, a position he founded, until his death in early December 2005.

Honors and awards
Colvin won Los Angeles' Drama-Logue Awards in five separate categories, as actor, director, playwright, producer, and production designer.

Personal life and demise
Colvin died in December 2005 from complications of a stroke. His body was cremated.

FilmographyThe Rat Patrol (1966-1968; TV Series) – Lieutenant Gustav LudenHow Sweet It Is! (1968) – Assistant ChiefViva Max! (1969) – GarciaMonte Walsh (1970) – Card CheatJeremiah Johnson (1972) – Lieutenant MulveyHickey & Boggs (1972) – ShawThe Life and Times of Judge Roy Bean (1972) – PimpScorpio (1973) – ThiefThe Stone Killer (1973) – Lionel JumperThe Terminal Man (1974) – DetectiveThe Crazy World of Julius Vrooder (1974) – SergeantRooster Cogburn (1975) – RedThe Bionic Woman (1976, TV Series) Kill Oscar - Baron Constantine
Embryo (1976) – Dr. Jim Winston
Exo-Man (1977) – Martin
Six Million Dollar Man (1977, TV Series) - Dark Side of the Moon, Part 1 and Part 2 - Dr. Charles Leith
Quincy, M.E. (1977, 1982; Television Series) – Ross; Bill Legget
The Incredible Hulk (1977–1981; TV series) – Jack McGee; 82 episodes
The Incredible Hulk Returns (1988; TV movie) – Jack McGee
Child's Play (1988) – Dr. Ardmore

References

External links

1934 births
2005 deaths
American male film actors
American male television actors
American male stage actors
Male actors from Kansas
People from Lyndon, Kansas
20th-century American male actors